PACE (PICS Asia-Pacific College Education) Canada College is a post-secondary academic institution located in Surrey, British Columbia. Founded in 2010, it offers 30 different courses and programs to both domestic and international students. PACE Canada College was made as a subsidiary of the Progressive Inter-cultural Community Services (PICS) Society, which provides programs and services that assist new immigrants, seniors, farm workers, women and youth.

The college is registered with the PCTIA.

Programs and Courses
Programs and courses offered at PACE Canada College include:
 Business Management
 Accounting
 Programming and Technology
 Database Administration 
 Health Care
 Career and Settlement Counselling
 Electrical Engineering
 Hospitality Management
 Trade

Additional Services
 PACE Canada College offers free English preparation and career counselling services.

References

External links
 "PACE Canada College" PACE Canada College, Vancouver.
  Progressive Intercultural Community Service Society, Vancouver.
 Private Career Training Institutions Agency, British Columbia.
 Canadian Information Centre for International Credentials (CICIC), Canada.

Education in Surrey, British Columbia